() is a Welsh word that has no direct English translation. The University of Wales, Lampeter, likens it to a homesickness tinged with grief and sadness over the lost or departed, especially in the context of Wales and Welsh culture. It is a mixture of longing, yearning, nostalgia, wistfulness or an earnest desire for the Wales of the past.

Etymology
A less likely, but possible, etymology is  'long' +  'pain, grief, sorrow, longing'. In the earliest citations in early Welsh poetry it implies 'grief or longing after the loss or death of someone'.

Culture

References

Sources
Williams, Robert (1865), “hiraeth”, in Lexicon Cornu-Britannicum: A Dictionary of the Ancient Celtic Language of Cornwall, in which the Words are elucidated by Copious Examples from the Cornish Works now remaining; With Translations in English, London: Trubner & Co., p. 217

External links 

 Hiraeth Smith College: Kahn Liberal Arts Institute
 BBC Wales - Arts - Hiraeth

Welsh words and phrases
Welsh culture
Nostalgia
Cornish culture
Words and phrases with no direct English translation